Alpha 606 (born Armando Martinez on November 15, 1974) is an acoustic/electronic artist based out of Miami. Alpha606 was originally conceived as a duet between Armando Martinez and Rey Rubio in 1998. Martinez is a programmer/composer and Rubio is a performing sound engineer. The duet expanded in 2003 and was joined by two percussionists, Marino Hernandez and Danny Chirino.

Their debut EP, Computer Controlled, was released on Dopamine Records in 2004. The group played a few live shows as a quartet, before parting ways. Since, Alpha 606 has consisted of solo artist Armando Martinez. Martinez continued touring and performing as Alpha 606 since 2004 with his solo laptop sets. Alpha 606 performed in Barcelona, London, Brussels, Helsinki, Bournemouth, Birmingham and Miami.

Alpha 606 has recorded on Interdimensional Transmissions and Touchin' Bass.

Reaction 
New Miami Times described their music as "a futuristic homage to Cuban culture, fusing warm machine tones and crisp bass notes with Afro-Cuban drums." Their style merges the drumbeat into the track: "Rubio and Martinez ensure that the drums don't 'sit on top' of the track, instead processing the rhythms so that they're subsumed into the rest of it, forming an elastic foundation."

Discography

Releases
 Electrónica Afro-Cubano (EP)  Interdimensional Transmissions  2008
 Computer Controlled (12")  Dopamine Records  2004

Remixes
 Nomadic Metro-Mover (12") Alphaphix (Alpha 606 Guanabana Mix) Dopamine Records  2005
 Exzakt Reworked and Remixed (12") Sleeping With The Enemy (Alpha 606 mix) Monotone  2006

Tracks Appear On
 Future Sound of Breaks (CD) Domino Sound Records (US)  2005
 Subsidence (CD, Promo) Anarchy In China Touchin' Bass  2005
 (2xLP) Anarchy In China Touchin' Bass  2005
 Subsidence (CD) Anarchy In China Touchin' Bass  2005
 Nobody's Perfect Part Two (CD, Promo) Anarchy In China Touchin' Bass  2006
 Nobody's Perfect Part Two (CD) Anarchy In China Touchin' Bass  2006
 Ten Volt (CD) Rise of Human Being Transient Force  2007

References

American electronic music groups
Musical groups established in 1998
1998 establishments in Florida